Cyperus rigidifolius is a species of sedge that is native to Africa and the Arabian Peninsula.

The species was first formally described by the botanist Ernst Gottlieb von Steudel in 1842.

See also
 List of Cyperus species

References

rigidifolius
Plants described in 1842
Taxa named by Ernst Gottlieb von Steudel
Flora of Ethiopia
Flora of Eritrea
Flora of Burundi
Flora of Kenya
Flora of Lesotho
Flora of Rwanda
Flora of Saudi Arabia
Flora of Malawi
Flora of Sudan
Flora of Uganda
Flora of Yemen
Flora of Tanzania
Flora of the Democratic Republic of the Congo
Flora of Zimbabwe
Flora of Zambia
Flora of South Africa